Qaen County (also Romanized as Ghayen) is in South Khorasan province, Iran. The capital of the county is the city of Qaen. At the 2006 census, the county's population was 137,357 in 35,783 households. The following census in 2011 counted 152,401 people in 42,002 households. At the 2016 census, the county's population was 116,181 in 34,794 households, by which time Zirkuh and Zohan Districts had been separated from the county to become Zirkuh County.

Administrative divisions

The population history and structural changes of Qaen County's administrative divisions over three consecutive censuses are shown in the following table. The latest census shows three districts, eight rural districts, and five cities.

References

 

Counties of South Khorasan Province